The Sam and Ruth Van Sickle Ford House is a historic house located at 404 S. Edgelawn Drive in Aurora, Illinois. The house was built in 1949–50 for painter and art teacher Ruth Van Sickle Ford and her husband, civil engineer Sam Ford. Architect Bruce Goff, an influential figure in the organic movement, designed the house. The house is dome-shaped, with Quonset hut ribs forming the frame of the dome. Most of the dome is covered in shingles; however, the southeast side of the dome was left open to give the house outdoor rooms. Two smaller domes containing the home's bedrooms abut the south and northeast sides of the main dome.

The house was added to the National Register of Historic Places on March 8, 2016.

References

National Register of Historic Places in Kane County, Illinois
Houses on the National Register of Historic Places in Illinois
Houses completed in 1950
Organic architecture
Bruce Goff buildings
Buildings and structures in Aurora, Illinois